Stefan Gelbhaar (born 9 July 1976) is a German lawyer and politician of the Alliance 90/The Greens who has been serving as a member of the Bundestag from the state of Berlin until 2021, when he gained the seat of Berlin-Pankow.

Early life and career 
Born in Friedrichshain, Berlin, Gelbhaar has lived in the Berlin district of Pankow since 1980. He attended the "Neumannschule" (30th POS) and the Carl-von-Ossietzky-Gymnasium, and later became a student at Humboldt University. He completed his legal clerkship in the state of Brandenburg. Afterwards he worked as a criminal defence lawyer.

Political career 
From 2011 until 2017, Gelbhaar served as a member of the State Parliament of Berlin, where he was his parliamentary group's spokesperson on transport.

Gelbhaar has been a member of the German Bundestag since the 2017 elections, representing Berlin-Pankow. In parliament, he is a member of the Committee on Transport and Digital Infrastructure and also serves as his parliamentary group's spokesman on urban mobility and cycling.

In addition to his committee assignments, Gelbhaar co-chairs the German-Korean Parliamentary Friendship Group.

Other activities 
 Deutsche Bahn, Member of the Supervisory Board (since 2022)

References

External links 

  
 Bundestag biography 

1976 births
Living people
People from Pankow
Members of the Bundestag for Berlin
Members of the Bundestag 2017–2021
Members of the Bundestag for Alliance 90/The Greens
Members of the Bundestag 2021–2025